Parapanteles is a genus of braconid wasps in the family Braconidae. There are more than 60 described species in Parapanteles, found throughout most of the world.

Species
These 62 species belong to the genus Parapanteles:

 Parapanteles aethiopicus (Wilkinson, 1931)
 Parapanteles aletiae (Riley, 1881)
 Parapanteles alternatus (Papp, 1973)
 Parapanteles arka Gupta, 2014
 Parapanteles aso (Nixon, 1967)
 Parapanteles atellae (Wilkinson, 1932)
 Parapanteles athamasae Gupta, Khot & Chorge, 2014
 Parapanteles bagicha (Narayanan & Subba Rao, 1961)
 Parapanteles cleo (Nixon, 1967)
 Parapanteles complexus Valerio & Janzen, 2009
 Parapanteles continuus Valerio & Whitfield, 2009
 Parapanteles covino Rousse, 2013
 Parapanteles cyclorhaphus (de Saeger, 1944)
 Parapanteles darignac Rousse, 2013
 Parapanteles demades (Nixon, 1965)
 Parapanteles echeriae Gupta, Pereira & Churi, 2013
 Parapanteles em Valerio & Whitfield, 2009
 Parapanteles endymion (Wilkinson, 1932)
 Parapanteles epiplemicidus (de Saeger, 1941)
 Parapanteles eros Gupta, 2014
 Parapanteles esha Gupta, 2014
 Parapanteles expulsus (Turner, 1919)
 Parapanteles fallax (de Saeger, 1944)
 Parapanteles folia (Nixon, 1965)
 Parapanteles furax (de Saeger, 1944)
 Parapanteles gerontogeae Donaldson, 1991
 Parapanteles hemitheae (Wilkinson, 1928)
 Parapanteles hyposidrae (Wilkinson, 1928)
 Parapanteles indicus (Bhatnagar, 1950)
 Parapanteles javensis (Rohwer, 1919)
 Parapanteles jhaverii (Bhatnagar, 1950)
 Parapanteles lincolnii Valerio & Whitfield, 2009
 Parapanteles maculipalpis (de Saeger, 1941)
 Parapanteles mariae Valerio & Whitfield, 2009
 Parapanteles masoni Austin & Dangerfield, 1992
 Parapanteles maynei (de Saeger, 1941)
 Parapanteles neocajani (Yousuf & Ray, 2010)
 Parapanteles neohyblaeae (Ray & Yousuf, 2009)
 Parapanteles nephos Valerio & Whitfield, 2009
 Parapanteles noae Valerio & Whitfield, 2009
 Parapanteles nydia (Nixon, 1967)
 Parapanteles paradoxus (Muesebeck, 1958)
 Parapanteles polus Valerio & Whitfield, 2009
 Parapanteles prosper (Wilkinson, 1932)
 Parapanteles prosymna (Nixon, 1965)
 Parapanteles punctatissimus (Granger, 1949)
 Parapanteles rarus Valerio & Whitfield, 2009
 Parapanteles regale Gupta, 2014
 Parapanteles regalis (de Saeger, 1941)
 Parapanteles rooibos Valerio, Whitfield & Kole, 2005
 Parapanteles sarpedon (de Saeger, 1944)
 Parapanteles sartamus (Nixon, 1965)
 Parapanteles scultena (Nixon, 1965)
 Parapanteles shivranginii Sathe & Ingawale, 1989
 Parapanteles sicpolus Valerio & Whitfield, 2009
 Parapanteles sireeshaae Ahmad & Akhtar, 2010
 Parapanteles tessares Valerio & Whitfield, 2009
 Parapanteles thrix Valerio & Whitfield, 2009
 Parapanteles tlinea Valerio & Whitfield, 2009
 Parapanteles transvaalensis (Cameron, 1911)
 Parapanteles turri (Rao & Chalikwar, 1976)
 Parapanteles xanthopholis (de Saeger, 1944)

References

Further reading

 
 
 

Microgastrinae
Braconidae genera